Nicola Venchiarutti (born 7 October 1998) is an Italian cyclist, who currently rides for UCI ProTeam .

Major results
2018
 2nd GP Adria Mobil
 4th Croatia–Slovenia
2019
 1st La Popolarissima
 1st Ruota d'Oro
 1st Stage 8 Girobio
2022
 3rd GP Adria Mobil

Grand Tour general classification results timeline

References

External links
 
 

1998 births
Living people
Italian male cyclists
People from Tolmezzo
Cyclists from Friuli Venezia Giulia